Chain-O-Lakes is an unincorporated community in Warren Township, St. Joseph County, in the U.S. state of Indiana.

History
The community was so named on account of there being a chain of lakes near the town site.

Geography

References

Unincorporated communities in St. Joseph County, Indiana
Unincorporated communities in Indiana